This is the list of the stations on digital television in the Philippines. The channels are available to viewers depends on the location. The National Telecommunications Commission (NTC) has adopted the ISDB-T standard for Philippine television.

Background

Most channels are still under test broadcast. All analog services are expected to shut down permanently by 2023.

*Data collected from sources and some wiki pages.
*Channels received may vary with location or with the strength of the signal of the broadcaster.
*Most of the channels are in the phase of test broadcast, resulting to some places that cannot receive other stations due to dead spots and low transmitting power among stations.
*Some Channels are encrypted and can only be accessed through select set-top box or mobile dongle manufacturers.

Mega Manila

Metro Manila, Batangas, Cavite, Laguna, Rizal, Bulacan & Pampanga

Luzon

Cordillera Administrative Region (CAR)

Benguet

Mountain Province

Region I (Ilocos Region)

Ilocos Sur

Region III (Central Luzon)

Pampanga

Region IV-A (Calabarzon)

Batangas

Quezon Province

Region V (Bicol Region)

Albay

Camarines Sur

Visayas

Region VI (Western Visayas)

Iloilo

Negros Occidental

Region VII (Central Visayas)

Cebu

Region VIII (Eastern Visayas)

Leyte

Mindanao

Region IX (Zamboanga Peninsula)

Zamboanga del Sur

Region X (Northern Mindanao)

Misamis Oriental

Region XI (Davao Region)

Davao del Sur

Region XII (Soccsksargen)

South Cotabato

Region XIII (Caraga Region)

Agusan del Norte

Former/inactive stations

ABS-CBN
On September 10, 2020, the National Telecommunications Commission issued a seven-page order recalling all the frequencies assigned to ABS-CBN Corporation in line with its franchise issue, including the ones used for digital television broadcast.

References

 
Philippines
Philippine television-related lists
Philippines, Stations